Pong Tao is a village and tambon (subdistrict) of Ngao District, in Lampang Province, Thailand. In 2005, it had a total population of 8846 people. The tambon contains 11 villages.

References

Tambon of Lampang province
Populated places in Lampang province